Molly Newman is a television writer and producer from Evansville, Indiana, who is most known for work on shows such as The Larry Sanders Show, Frasier, Murphy Brown, Tracey Takes On...,  Maximum Bob, and Brothers & Sisters.

In 1985, she was nominated for Broadway's Tony Award in the category, Best Book (Musical) with collaborator Barbara Damashek for Quilters.

References

External links
 
 Information on Molly Newmans' plays

Year of birth missing (living people)
Living people
Writers from Evansville, Indiana
American television writers
American women television producers
American women television writers
Screenwriters from Indiana
Television producers from Indiana
21st-century American women